Wayne Baughman (January 4, 1941 – February 16, 2022) was an American wrestler, coach and ultra-endurance athlete. He competed in the 1964 Summer Olympics, the 1968 Summer Olympics, and the 1972 Summer Olympics.

Biography
He was born and raised in Oklahoma City, Oklahoma. He attended John Marshall Jr-Sr High School (1953–59) and the University of Oklahoma (1959–1963). He earned letters in football and wrestling in high school. Baughman concluded his 27th and final year as the United States Air Force Academy’s Head Wrestling Coach, as well as his 50-year involvement as a competitor, coach and administrator in Wrestling in 2007. From 1963 through 1972, he made three Olympic teams, eight World teams (including a freestyle/Greco-Roman double in 1965), and won 16 national titles (he never placed lower than third at a national event). He is also the only person who has won national championships in the four recognized wrestling styles (collegiate, freestyle, Greco-Roman, and Sambo), and one of only two wrestlers to have placed in the Olympics and/or World Championships in the three international styles (FS, GR, & Sombo).

Baughman elected to go with coaches Port Robertson and Tommy Evans at OU. The four years he was at OU, the team won the NCAA Team Championship twice and took second behind OSU the other two years. As an individual, Baughman won the NCAA Championship once and finished 2nd twice. He also won the Big 8 Championship twice, was 2nd once and received both the Most Falls Trophy and Outstanding Wrestler Award his senior season (1963).

Baughman was on three Olympic teams (1964, 1968, and 1972) and eight World Championship teams. He was head coach of the 1976 U.S. Olympic Freestyle Wrestling Team. He also coached five world Championship teams including both FS and GR.  His record in 25 National Championships is 16 first-place finishes, 7 seconds, and 2 third-place finishes.

Baughman's first Air Force assignment was to Tinker AFB, Oklahoma. He then spent five years as an instructor and coach at the United States Air Force Academy Preparatory School, five years as Chief of Air Force Programs (Athletic Director of the entire Air Force) at HQ USAF, then nine years as an instructor and head wrestling coach at the United States Air Force Academy. After retiring from USAF active duty, he served as Director of Operations and Assistant General Manager for the 1986 World Cycling Championships, wrote the book Wrestling On and Off the Mat and did speaking engagements and Clinics. Baughman returned to the head wrestling coach position as a civilian. He served as an Athletes Representative on many wrestling committees.

Kyle Klingman, associate director at the International Wrestling Institute and Museum, documented the impact of Baughman's career by stating:

Baughman is one of 33 native Oklahomans who have been inducted as Distinguished Members of the National Wrestling Hall of Fame and Museum.

Mike Chapman, Executive Director of the Dan Gable International Wrestling Institute and Museum, wrote a book called Wrestling Tough. He described Baughman saying he:

After completing his competitive wrestling career, Baughman became involved in ultra-endurance events. He has completed the Pikes Peak Marathon five times, the Ironman Triathlon in Hawaii, the Leadville 100 Mile Trail run twice, The "Bad Water 146" mile run, the Grand Canyon Rim to Rim and Back Again, the Hardscrabble Pass 100 mile Bicycle. Baughman is included in another Mike Chapman book, The Toughest Men in Sports, and was the model for the man at the base of the Air Force Monument in downtown Oklahoma City.

Baughman died in Colorado Springs, Colorado, on February 16, 2022, at the age of 81.

References

1941 births
2022 deaths
Sportspeople from Oklahoma City
Military personnel from Oklahoma
Oklahoma Sooners wrestlers
Wrestlers at the 1964 Summer Olympics
Wrestlers at the 1968 Summer Olympics
Wrestlers at the 1972 Summer Olympics
American male sport wrestlers
American sambo practitioners
Olympic wrestlers of the United States
Air Force Falcons wrestling coaches
Pan American Games medalists in wrestling
Pan American Games gold medalists for the United States
Wrestlers at the 1967 Pan American Games